Mmusa Ohilwe (born 17 April 1986) is a Botswanan footballer who currently plays for Extension Gunners in the Botswana Premier League. He has won twenty-nine caps for the Botswana national football team.

Club career

Mmusa started his career in the Botswana Premier League at Botswana Meat Commission (BMC FC) in 2005 and later switched Township Rollers in 2007 where he spent two seasons before going back to BMC where he started his career.
With his defensive abilities highly regarded, Ohilwe went on trial to Greece before returning home to join Gaborone United Gaborone United then BMC again before switching to Extension Gunners in January 2014 after returning from Vietnam where he had a successful trial but could not make a move due to administrative issues.

International career

He has featured in the national team twenty nine times to date and he was a member of the team that made history by being the first team to qualify for the African Nations Cup for the first time in 2012.

International goals
Scores and results list Botswana's goal tally first.

References

External links

1986 births
Living people
Botswana footballers
Gilport Lions F.C. players
Gaborone United S.C. players
Botswana international footballers
Township Rollers F.C. players
2012 Africa Cup of Nations players
Association football defenders